The 2015 Pan American Men's Youth Handball Championship took place in San Cristobal from 21–25 April. It acts as the Pan American qualifying tournament for the 2015 Men's Youth World Handball Championship.

Results

Round robin

Final standing

References

External links
PATHF Official Website

2015 in handball
Pan American Men's Youth Handball Championship
International sports competitions hosted by Venezuela
April 2015 sports events in South America
2015 in Venezuelan sport